Hoffman's Playland was an amusement park located in Latham, New York on Route 9. The park featured 18 rides along with food stands, a Subway restaurant, a party area, and an arcade. The park operated from 1952 until its closing on September 14, 2014. The amusement park rides were purchased by Huck Finn's Warehouse and now operate as Huck Finn's Playland at the furniture store's Albany location.

History 

In 1952, William Hoffman founded Hoffman's Playland in Latham, New York. The park originally featured a miniature train, and a Merry-Go Round. William Hoffman and his eventual wife Hedy expanded the park over the years to include more children's rides to cater to the baby boomers. Hoffman's Playland opened during a golden era of children's amusement parks. William Hoffman's son David Hoffman took over as the park's owner in the 1970s and operated the park with his wife Ruth until its closing in 2014.

Throughout the 1950s and 1960s, the park expanded to include more children's rides including many popular Allan Herschell Company rides. In 1953, the Boat ride was added, along with live animals. in 1955, the Caterpillar ride was added and 1956 brought the addition of the Sky Fighter Jets. 1958 saw the addition of the Helicopter ride. The park expanded again in 1960 to include a Herschell Turnpike ride and a Herschell Little Dipper Roller Coaster.

As the park progressed into the 1960s and 70's, it was evident there was a need for larger rides that adults and teenagers could ride, along with additional rides to handle growing crowds. In 1962, the Playland purchased a set of Lusse Auto Skooter Bumpers Cars, and in 1965, an Eli Bridge Company Scrambler was added. In 1971, the park added a 50-foot Eli Bridge Ferris Wheel, and 1974 saw the addition of a Frank Hrubetz & Company Paratrooper. The 1980s brought major change to the park as a large entrance building was added and featured offices, a Subway (restaurant), ticket booths, a new train station, and a gift shop. In 1983, a Samba Space Ship ride was added, and in 1985 a Tilt-a-Whirl opened after being relocated from the closed Hanson's Amusement Park. Additionally, the 1980s brought change to the park's miniature railroad. The original train could no longer accommodate the larger crowds, so in the early 1980s the park bought and refurbished an Allan Herschell S-24 Iron Horse train with 3 coaches and put it into operation for the 1980 season. The park would find another identical engine with three coaches eight years later and refurbish it to be ready for the 1988 season. The original turnpike ride was also retired for a new car ride, the 4x4 trucks.

The park would continue expanding into the 1990s and early 2000s. The year 2000 brought the addition of the Balloon Flight ride. The early 2000s also brought the addition of the Tea Cup umbrella ride. In 2007, the Red Baron plane ride was added. The Red Baron was purchased and refurbished from the recently closed Catskill Game Farm. This resulted into the relocation of the Helicopters and the retirement of the Space Ship Samba ride.

In 2013, rumors surfaced that the Hoffmans would retire and close the park. The park remained open for the 2013 season, however at the start of the 2014 season, the owners, Dave and Ruth Hoffman, announced their intent to retire and close the park in September. The park officially closed at 6pm on September 14, 2014. Large crowds on the last day of operation resulted in rides being run well past closing time and into the evening.

Throughout the last season, the Hoffmans searched for a local buyer of the rides but were not successful. The park's rides and equipment were scheduled to go to auction, however shortly after the park closed, Huck Finn's Warehouse in nearby Downtown Albany made an offer to purchase the amusement rides and equipment. The park was dismantled and moved to a newly built park next to Huck Finn's Warehouse. The new park, Huck Finn's Playland, opened in June 2015.

Operating Schedule 
The park generally operated from late March/early April (depending on the year) through the end of September. The park was open on weekends during the spring and fall, and daily during the summer months. The park opened at noon on operating days and closed as early as 6 p.m. during the spring and fall, and 9 p.m. or 10 p.m. during the busy summer months.

Post-Closure 
Since the park closed in September 2014, the land in which the amusement park once sat has vacant and overgrown. The site is currently being considered for a Senior Housing project.

Rides 
The park offered 19 rides at its peak and as of the parks closing in 2014, the park offered the following 18. All, with the exception of the Samba ride and the Bumper Cars were moved to Huck Finn's Playland. The Samba ride is assumed to have been scrapped after the 2007 or 2008 season and the Bumper Cars were put into storage and later sold to Knoebels Amusement Resort.

See also 
Huck Finn's Playland
List of defunct amusement parks

References

Defunct amusement parks in New York (state)
Amusement parks opened in 1952
2014 disestablishments in New York (state)
1952 establishments in New York (state)